The women's football tournament at the 2016 Summer Olympics was held from 3 to 19 August 2016. It was the 6th edition of the women's Olympic football tournament. Together with the men's competition, the 2016 Summer Olympics football tournament was held in six cities in Brazil, including Olympic host city Rio de Janeiro, which hosted the final at the Maracanã Stadium. There were no player age restrictions for teams participating in the women's competition.

In March 2016, it was agreed that the competition would be part of IFAB's trial to allow a fourth substitute to be made during extra time. 2012 gold medalists the United States, were eliminated in a loss against Sweden in a penalty shoot-out in the quarter-finals. This marked the first time that the United States has not progressed to the semi-finals in a major international tournament. For the first time since the introduction of the women's tournament in 1996, three matches in the knockout stage were decided by a penalty shoot-out (two quarter-finals and one semi-final).

Germany won their first gold medal by defeating Sweden 2–1 in the final.		
Canada won bronze after beating host Brazil with the same scoreline in the bronze medal game.

Competition schedule
The match schedule of the women's tournament was unveiled on 10 November 2015.

Qualification

In addition to host nation Brazil, 11 women's national teams qualified from six separate continental confederations. FIFA ratified the distribution of spots at the Executive Committee meeting in March 2014.

Dates and venues are those of final tournaments (or final round of qualification tournaments), various qualification stages may precede matches at these specific venues.
England finished in the top three among UEFA teams in the World Cup, however England is not an IOC member and talks for them to compete as Great Britain broke down.
Nations making their Olympic tournament debut

Venues

The tournament was held in seven venues across six cities:
Mineirão, Belo Horizonte
Estádio Nacional Mané Garrincha, Brasília
Arena da Amazônia, Manaus
Estádio Olímpico João Havelange, Rio de Janeiro
Maracanã, Rio de Janeiro
Itaipava Arena Fonte Nova, Salvador
Arena Corinthians, São Paulo

Squads

The women's tournament was a full international tournament with no restrictions on age. Each team had to submit a squad of 18 players, two of whom must be goalkeepers. Each team might also have a list of four alternate players, who would replace any player in the squad in case of injury during the tournament.

Match officials
On 2 May 2016, FIFA released the list of match referees that would officiate at the Olympics.

Notes

Draw
The draw for the tournament was held on 14 April 2016, 10:30 BRT (UTC−3), at the Maracanã Stadium, Rio de Janeiro. The 12 teams in the women's tournament were drawn into three groups of four teams. The teams were seeded into four pots based on the FIFA Ranking of March 2016 (in brackets in the table). The hosts Brazil were automatically assigned into position E1. No groups can contain more than one team from the same confederation.

Group stage
The top two teams of each group and the two best third-placed teams advanced to the quarter-finals. The rankings of teams in each group were determined as follows:
 points obtained in all group matches;
 goal difference in all group matches;
 number of goals scored in all group matches;
If two or more teams were equal on the basis of the above three criteria, their rankings were determined as follows:
 points obtained in the group matches between the teams concerned;
 goal difference in the group matches between the teams concerned;
 number of goals scored in the group matches between the teams concerned;
 drawing of lots by the FIFA Organising Committee.

The groups were denoted as groups E, F and G to avoid confusion with the groups of the men's tournament which used designations A–D.

Group E

Group F

Group G

Ranking of third-placed teams

Knockout stage

In the knockout stages, if a match is level at the end of normal playing time, extra time is played (two periods of 15 minutes each) and followed, if necessary, by a penalty shoot-out to determine the winner.

On 18 March 2016, the FIFA Executive Committee agreed that the competition would be part of the International Football Association Board's trial to allow a fourth substitute to be made during extra time.

Quarter-finals

Semi-finals

Bronze medal match

Gold medal match

Statistics

Goalscorers

Assists

FIFA Fair Play Award
Sweden won the FIFA Fair Play Award, given to the team with the best record of fair play during the tournament. Every match in the tournament was taken into account, though only teams that reached the knockout stage were eligible to win the award.

Tournament ranking

See also
 Football at the 2016 Summer Olympics – Men's tournament

References

External links

Football – Women, Rio2016.com
Women's Olympic Football Tournament, Rio 2016, FIFA.com
FIFA Technical Report

 
Women
2016
Summer Olympics
2016
Women's events at the 2016 Summer Olympics